Arkansas Highway 195 (AR 195, Ark. 195, and Hwy. 195) is the designation for a state highway in the U.S. state of Arkansas. The route is split into three sections, all of which are located in southwest Arkansas. The first section begins at AR 355 in Fulton, and ends at US 278 in Washington. The second section begins at AR 332 in De Ann, and ends at US 371 just east of Blevins. The third section begins at US 371 just east of McCaskill, and ends at AR 26 in Delight. All three routes are maintained by the Arkansas Department of Transportation (ARDOT).

Route description

Section 1 

The first section of AR 195 begins at AR 355 in Fulton. The route runs towards the northeast for about  before intersecting AR 73 in Cross Roads. The route continues northwest for about  before reaching its northern terminus at US 278 in Washington.

Section 2 
The second section of AR 195 begins at AR 332 in De Ann. The route heads almost directly north for about  before reaching its northern terminus at US 371 just east of Blevins. The route does not intersect any other communities or highways throughout its entire length.

Section 3 
The third section of AR 195 begins at US 371 just east of McCaskill. The route heads mainly towards the east, before turning towards the north shortly before crossing the Little Missouri River. Shortly after, the route intersects AR 301 just south of Pisgah, which provides direct access to the Crater of Diamonds State Park. The route continues for just under  before intersecting AR 26 in Delight.

Major intersections

References 

195
 Transportation in Hempstead County, Arkansas
 Transportation in Pike County, Arkansas